In fluid dynamics, Taylor scraping flow is a type of two-dimensional corner flow occurring when one of the wall is sliding over the other with constant velocity, named after G. I. Taylor.

Flow description

This description is equivalent to moving the scraper towards right with velocity . The problem is singular at  because at the origin, the velocities are discontinuous, thus the velocity gradient is infinite there.

Taylor noticed that the inertial terms are negligible as long as the region of interest is within ( or, equivalently Reynolds number ), thus within the region the flow is essentially a Stokes flow. Then for two-dimensional planar problem, the equation is

The boundary conditions are

Solution

Attempting a separable solution of the form  reduces the problem to

with boundary conditions

The solution is

Therefore, the velocity field is

Pressure can be obtained through integration of the momentum equation

which gives,

Stresses on the scraper

The tangential stress and the normal stress on the scraper due to pressure  and viscous forces are

The same scraper stress if resolved according to Cartesian coordinates (parallel and perpendicular to the lower plate i.e. ) are

In real life, there will be a huge pressure at the point, which depends on the geometry of the contact. The stresses are shown in the figure as given in the Taylor's original paper.

Taylor says: "The most interesting and perhaps unexpected feature of the calculations is that  does not change sign in the range . In the range  the contribution to  due to normal stress is of opposite sign to that due to tangential stress, but the latter is the greater. The palette knives used by artists for removing paint from their palettes are very flexible scrapers. In fact artists instinctively hold their palette knives in this position." Further he adds "A plasterer on the other hand holds a smoothing tool so that  is small.

Scraping a power-law fluid
Since scraping applications are important for non-Newtonian fluid (for example, scraping paint, nail polish, cream, butter, honey, etc.,), it is essential to consider this case. The analysis was carried out by J. Riedler and Wilhelm Schneider in 1983 and they were able to obtain self-similar solutions for power-law fluids satisfying the relation for the apparent viscosity

The solution for the streamfunction of the flow created by the plate moving towards right is given by

where

and

It can be verified that this solution reduces to that of Taylor's for Newtonian fluids, i.e., when .

References

Fluid dynamics
Flow regimes